Fergusson Island is the largest island of the D'Entrecasteaux Islands, in Papua New Guinea. There are three large volcanoes on the island.

Fergusson Island is situated 3 km across the Dawson Strait from Normanby Island and 4 km from Goodenough Island across Moresby Strait.

The highest peak at 6,801 feet (2,073 metres) near Wadalei in the north-east of Fergusson Island is an extinct volcano. Seymour Bay is located on the west coast, Sebutuia Bay on the east, and Hughes Bay on the north. The principal settlements, Salamo and Mapamoiwa, are on the southern coast. Gold deposits at Wapolu on the north coast were worked briefly in the mid-1990s.

The island was named by Captain John Moresby after Sir James Fergusson, who was Governor-General of New Zealand from 1873 to 1874.

On June 30, 1942, during World War II, a United States Navy PT-Boat base was established on the island. An Alamo Scouts Training Center was established at Kalo Kalo on November 28, 1943.

See also
Panniet naked-backed fruit bat
Black-naped pheasant-pigeon

References

External links
Papua New Guinea: Orchid News

D'Entrecasteaux Islands
Islands of Milne Bay Province
Volcanoes of Papua New Guinea